The New York Slave Revolt of 1712 was an uprising in New York City, in the Province of New York, of 23 Black slaves. They killed nine whites and injured another six before they were stopped. More than 70 black people were arrested and jailed. Of these, 27 were put on trial, and 21 convicted and executed.

Events
By the early 18th century, New York City had one of the largest enslaved populations of any of the settlements in the Thirteen Colonies. Slavery in the city differed from some of the other colonies because there were no plantations producing cash crops. Slaves worked as domestic servants, artisans, dock workers, and various skilled laborers.
Enslaved Africans lived near each other, making communication easy. They also often worked among free black people, a situation that did not exist on most Southern plantations.  Slaves in the city could communicate and plan a conspiracy more easily than among those on plantations.

After the seizure of New Netherland in 1667 and its incorporation into the Province of New York, the rights of the Free Negro social group were gradually eroded. In 1702, the first of the New York slave codes were passed, which further limited the rights enjoyed by the African community in New York; many of these legal rights, such as the right to own land and marry, were granted during the Dutch colonial period. On December 13, 1711, the New York City Common Council established the city's first slave market near Wall Street for the sale and rental of enslaved Africans and Native Americans.

By the early 1700s, about 20 percent of the population were enslaved black people. The colonial government in New York restricted this group through several measures: requiring slaves to carry a pass if traveling more than a mile (1.6 km) from home; discouraging marriage among them; prohibiting gatherings in groups of more than three persons; and requiring them to sit in separate galleries at church services.

A group of more than twenty black slaves, the majority of whom were believed to be Coromantee or Akan, gathered on the night of April 6, 1712, and set fire to a building on Maiden Lane near Broadway. While the white colonists tried to put out the fire, the enslaved blacks, armed with guns, hatchets, and swords, attacked the whites and then ran off. 8 whites were killed and 7 wounded. All of the runaway slaves were captured almost immediately and returned to their owners.

Aftermath
Colonial forces arrested seventy blacks and jailed them. Six are reported to have committed suicide. Twenty-seven were put on trial, 21 of whom were convicted and sentenced to death, including one woman with child. Twenty were burned to death and one was executed on a breaking wheel.

After the revolt, the city and colony passed more restrictive laws governing black and Indian slaves. Slaves were not permitted to gather in groups of more than three, they were not permitted to carry firearms, and gambling was outlawed. Crimes of property damage, rape, and conspiracy to kill qualified for the death penalty. Free blacks were still allowed to own land, however. Anthony Portuguese (alternately spelled Portugies), owned land that makes up a portion of present-day Washington Square Park; this continued to be owned by his daughter and grandchildren.

The colony required slave owners who wanted to free their slaves to pay a tax of £200 per person, then an amount much higher than the cost of a slave. In 1715 Governor Robert Hunter argued in London before the Lords of Trade that manumission and the chance for a slave to inherit part of a master's wealth was important to maintain in New York. He said that this was a proper reward for a slave who had helped a master earn a lifetime's fortune, and that it could keep the slave from descending into despair.

References

Further reading
 .
 .
 
 .
  (Fiction).

Riots and civil disorder in New York City
1712 riots
1712 in the Province of New York
African-American history in New York City
Slave rebellions in the United States
18th century in New York City
18th-century rebellions